Apache Kid is a historical Native American.

Apache Kid may also refer to:

 Apache Kid (comics), a fictional character from Marvel Comics named after the historical Native American
 Apache Kid Wilderness, a natural forest area in New Mexico similarly named after the historical Native American
 The Apache Kid (1930 film), a Krazy Kat cartoon
 The Apache Kid (1941 film), an American Western film